In enzymology, a 2-(R)-hydroxypropyl-CoM dehydrogenase is an enzyme that catalyzes the chemical reaction

2-(R)-hydroxypropyl-CoM + NAD+  2-oxopropyl-CoM + NADH + H+

Thus, the two substrates of this enzyme are 2-(R)-hydroxypropyl-CoM and NAD+, whereas its 3 products are 2-oxopropyl-CoM, NADH, and H+.

This enzyme belongs to the family of oxidoreductases, specifically those acting on the CH-OH group of donor with NAD+ or NADP+ as acceptor. The systematic name of this enzyme class is 2-[2-(R)-hydroxypropylthio]ethanesulfonate:NAD+ oxidoreductase. This enzyme is also called 2-(2-(R)-hydroxypropylthio)ethanesulfonate dehydrogenase.

Structural studies

As of late 2007, only one structure has been solved for this class of enzymes, with the PDB accession code .

References

 

EC 1.1.1
NADH-dependent enzymes
Enzymes of known structure